is a fictional boxer and the main protagonist in Nintendo's Punch-Out!! series of video games. He first appeared in the Nintendo Entertainment System game Punch-Out!!. He is the smallest and youngest of all the boxers in the games, being only 17 years old across all Punch-Out!! games. His signature attack is the "STAR Punch". His design was changed for the SNES Super Punch-Out!!, but reverted to his original design in the Wii title. In the NES and Wii games, Little Mac is accompanied by Doc Louis, his trainer.

In addition to his own series, Little Mac has made multiple cameo appearances in and out of video games; video games include Captain Rainbow, Fight Night Round 2 and the Super Smash Bros. series, while he appeared in a variety of comic books, including those created by Valiant Comics. Little Mac has received positive reception since his debut and has been regarded as one of the best protagonists in video games by multiple publications.

Concept and creation
Since his appearance in Punch-Out!! for the NES, Little Mac has been represented with black hair; he usually wears a black tank top, green shorts, and green boxing gloves, however, in Super Punch-Out!! he appears with blonde hair and blue pants. He was originally going to be named Peter Punch, but this was changed before the game's debut. He is 17 years old, 140 centimeters tall (170 cm in the Wii version), and hails from The Bronx. This makes him the shortest and youngest boxer in all of the Punch-Out!! games. In all games, players took control of Mac against the taller opponents, where Mac could only dodge in various directions, block, and perform stomach punches, uppercuts, and the "Star Uppercut". Mac can perform the Star Uppercut by collecting stars, which are obtained by attacking opponents in specific ways. Mac has a stamina meter; if it runs out, he turns pink and must be given time to recover. If he is knocked down, players must mash the A button to make him stand up.

The identity of the player character in Super Punch-Out!! is the source of contention; Bryce Holliday, one of the main developers of the Wii version of Punch-Out, states that the player character in Super Punch-Out is not Little Mac. However, during the North American and European Virtual Console releases of the SNES title, Nintendo of America and Europe have claimed that Little Mac is in the SNES game. The history section of the official website for the Wii version of Punch-Out!! also states that the character is Little Mac. According to Nintendo of America, the SNES title takes place after the events of the NES and Wii titles of the series; Little Mac looks different because he was given a makeover, and his repertoire has expanded since separating from Doc Louis, including the "Knockout Punch" and the "Rapid Punch".

Before the SNES Super Punch-Out!! was finished and released, some screenshots and video footage of the prototype seen in gaming magazines showed him with a different look compared to his final version seen in the finished and released version. and two official television commercials Instead of using stars to do powerful attacks, Little Mac builds up a strength meter by doing well against his opponents, like in the arcade versions of Punch-Out!!. It will lower when he is hit or when the opponent blocks his attack.

He was voiced in Punch-Out!! for Wii by Matt Harty, a sound designer for Next Level Games. Unlike his opponents, his design in Punch-Out!! for Wii has not changed much. They specifically kept him as a silent protagonist due to how similar the Wii game is to the NES game as well as the tradition of silent Nintendo protagonists such as Kirby, Link, and Ness. The designers also wanted Mac to be an avatar for the player. They were originally going to allow players to upgrade Little Mac's abilities; however, they felt that it would take away from the challenge of overcoming opponents, as well as diminish peoples' interests in Little Mac.

Appearances
Little Mac first appeared in the arcade video game Punch-Out!! as an unnamed boxer. He would later get his name in the NES game Mike Tyson's Punch Out!!, the third game in the series and his third appearance. He has appeared as the main protagonist in every Punch-Out!! game since. His next appearance was in Super Punch-Out!! for the Super NES, which gave him a drastically different design. Most recently in his series, he appeared in the Wii video game Punch-Out!!. The Wii game adds a multi-player mode, where a second player can take control of an alternate Mac. In this mode, either player can transform into Giga Mac, a larger and more powerful version of Mac. Giga Mac's name was planned to be "Big Mac" in keeping with the "little" in Little Mac's name, but this was changed to avoid comparison to McDonald's Big Mac.

Little Mac has made multiple cameo appearances. His first was in the GameCube version of Fight Night Round 2, where his SNES incarnation is featured as a playable character alongside the ability to play the entire SNES game. He appeared in the Wii video game Captain Rainbow, which featured a variety of obscure Nintendo characters, as an "overweight has-been". Mac also appeared as an Assist Trophy in Super Smash Bros. Brawl, assisting players who summoned him. Little Mac joined the playable roster in Super Smash Bros. for Nintendo 3DS and Wii U, where he is a fighter who is fast and strong on the ground, but is substantially weaker in the air. A mechanic unique to Little Mac is the Power Meter, drawn from the arcade titles, which builds as Mac deals and receives damage. When the meter is full, Mac gains access to the K.O. Uppercut. Little Mac makes a return appearance in Super Smash Bros. Ultimate.

Little Mac's green headgear is featured as downloadable content in the Wii game Animal Crossing: City Folk, which players could put on their characters in the game. The game Abobo's Big Adventure, a fan game which features numerous Nintendo characters, featured Little Mac as its final boss.

Little Mac is also featured as the protagonist in the Punch-Out!! stories featured in Valiant Comics' Nintendo Comics System. He appears in the stories "The First Fight", "Outsiders", and "Fox and Hounds." Mac also makes a cameo in the prologue short of the Captain N comic books.

Promotion and merchandise

In 2009, he was portrayed by former professional boxer Paulie Malignaggi in an American commercial for Punch-Out!! on the Wii. In an interview, Malignaggi commented that he was asked to play a "young Italian-American guy, good looking with a cocky attitude and a heavy New York accent".

Reception
Since his appearance in the Punch-Out!! series, Little Mac has received generally positive reception, and is regarded as a major Nintendo character. GameSpot featured him in a user poll as part of the "all time greatest video game hero" contest. Nintendo Power listed Little Mac as their 11th favorite hero, stating that he taught gamers that more intimidating foes can be overcome by patience, persistence, and "pattern recognition". GamesRadar listed him as the 68th greatest video game hero, and called him the "definition of an underdog hero", due to fighting much larger opponents than himself. GamesRadar's Mikel Reparaz listed Mac's Star Uppercut as one of the most satisfying uppercuts in video games.

However, Little Mac has also received criticism. Both his updated design and Doc Louis' absence were listed by NintendoWorldReport's Neal Ronaghan as weak points of Super Punch-Out!! In their list of the top five racist video games, 1UP.com listed the Punch-Out!! franchise, and referred to Little Mac as the "Great White Hope" relative to the stereotypical character designs of his opponents. The Escapists Sumantra Lahiri wrote that Little Mac was the only boxer in the game who did not have a "negative stereotype associated with him".

After being a long-time requested inclusion within the Super Smash Bros. series, Little Mac made his debut in the series in Super Smash Bros. Brawl as an "Assist Trophy", a non-playable character that assists the fighter who summoned them. The series' subsequent installments, Super Smash Bros. for Nintendo 3DS and Wii U, transitioned Mac into a full-fledged playable character. In addition to using his updated design from the Wii version of Punch-Out!!, his Giga Mac transformation from that same game is also featured as his "Final Smash", a one-use special move that can only be activated upon breaking a "Smash Ball". Little Mac also appears as a playable character in Super Smash Bros. Ultimate, although his Final Smash has been modified like other transformation-esque Final Smashes. Little Mac's reputation as an underdog has also made its way into the Smash fanbase, as his moveset in Super Smash Bros. Ultimate has been met with harsh criticism as he is one of the easiest characters to defeat once off stage, but maintains one of the best ground games in the entire series, leaving fans polarized about his playstyle. Prior to his inclusion in the Super Smash Bros. series, Gamasutra's Kyle Orland commented that Little Mac's absence from it was "mind-boggling". The qualities listed included his popularity, fighting ability, and "retro cred"; Orland felt that it did not make sense to feature characters such as Ice Climbers and Mr. Game & Watch instead of Mac. IGN's Lucas M. Thomas and Matt Casamassina expressed disappointment that Little Mac was not playable in Brawl, and suggested that perhaps series creator Masahiro Sakurai could not think of a good moveset for him. Jeremy Parish of Polygon ranked 73 fighters from Super Smash Bros. Ultimate "from garbage to glorious", listing Little Mac as 37th.

Little Mac has also been featured in a number of merchandise items and collectibles. As part of a "boxing challenge" held by Nintendo at its Nintendo World store in Rockefeller Plaza, Nintendo awarded, in part, a training sweatshirt similar to Little Mac's. Nintendo also released a pair of Little Mac-signed green boxing gloves on Amazon.com, which were contained in a wood frame and casing. The band Game Over created a song called "Little Mac's Confession", which follows Little Mac's "crushing KO" against Mr. Dream.

Notes

References

Fictional characters from The Bronx
Fictional American people in video games
Fictional martial artists in video games
Fictional professional boxers
Fictional adolescents
Fictional boxers
Male characters in video games
Nintendo protagonists
Punch-Out!! characters
Super Smash Bros. fighters
Video game characters introduced in 1983
Teenage characters in video games